Tuala Ainiu Iusitino (1936 – 31 August 2010) was a Samoan politician and former Cabinet Minister.  He represented the constituency of Gaga'emauga No. 1.

Following the 2001 election he was appointed Minister of Women's Affairs. He also served as Minister of Broadcasting.

He lost his seat in the 2006 election.

References

Members of the Legislative Assembly of Samoa
Samoan chiefs
1936 births
2010 deaths
People from Gaga'emauga
Government ministers of Samoa